Cyperus alternifolius, the umbrella papyrus, umbrella sedge or umbrella palm, is a grass-like plant in the very large genus Cyperus of the sedge family Cyperaceae. The plant is native to West Africa, Madagascar and the Arabian Peninsula, but widely distributed throughout the world. It has gained the Royal Horticultural Society's Award of Garden Merit. The subspecies Cyperus alternifolius ssp. flabelliformis is also known as Cyperus involucratus .

Cultivation
Cyperus alternifolius is frequently cultivated as an ornamental plant worldwide. It is planted in gardens in the ground, pots, in ponds, and as a houseplant. It is not hardy, and requires protection when temperatures fall below  (USDA Zones: 9a–11b). It is propagated by dividing the roots and requires copious amounts of water. The cultivar Cyperus alternifolius 'Variegatus' is grown for its variegated foliage and smaller size.

See also
 List of Cyperus species

References

External links
 

alternifolius
Freshwater plants
House plants
Garden plants of Africa
Flora of Madagascar
Flora of Eritrea
Flora of Ethiopia
Flora of Somalia
Flora of Sudan
Flora of Kenya
Flora of Tanzania
Flora of Uganda
Flora of Malawi
Flora of Mozambique
Flora of Zimbabwe
Flora of Réunion
Plants described in 1772
Taxa named by Christen Friis Rottbøll